Lukhanyo Welcome Nomzanga (born 8 October 1987) is a South African rugby union player, who last played first class rugby as a flanker for the  in the Currie Cup and in the Rugby Challenge.

Rugby career

Amateur rugby

Nomzanga was born in King William's Town in the Eastern Cape, but played amateur club rugby in the Western Cape, playing for Belhar and False Bay. He was also selected in a Western Province Amateur team that competed in the national povincial competition in 2012.

Border Bulldogs

He started a total of five matches in the qualification campaign that saw them finish bottom of the log with six defeats and four more starts in the 2014 Currie Cup First Division, where they also finished last.

In 2015, Nomzanga made six appearances in the 2015 Vodacom Cup and another six in the 2015 Currie Cup qualification series. He didn't play in the First Division, but returned the following year to play in eleven of the Bulldogs' matches in the 2015 Currie Cup qualification series.

In July 2016, it was revealed that Nomzanga received a ban from the sport after failing a drugs test. He tested positively for methylhexaneamine and initially received an eight-month ban, which was due to rule him out of action until March 2017.

References

South African rugby union players
Living people
1987 births
People from Qonce
Rugby union flankers
Border Bulldogs players
Doping cases in rugby union
Rugby union players from the Eastern Cape